The Kolmogorov axioms are the foundations of probability theory introduced by Russian mathematician Andrey Kolmogorov in 1933. These axioms remain central and have direct contributions to mathematics, the physical sciences, and real-world probability cases. An alternative approach to formalising probability, favoured by some Bayesians, is given by Cox's theorem.

Axioms 
Then  is a probability space, with sample space , event space  and probability measure .

First axiom 
The probability of an event is a non-negative real number:

where  is the event space. It follows that  is always finite, in contrast with more general measure theory.  Theories which assign negative probability relax the first axiom.

Second axiom 

This is the assumption of unit measure: that the probability that at least one of the elementary events in the entire sample space will occur is 1

Third axiom 
This is the assumption of σ-additivity:
 Any countable sequence of disjoint sets (synonymous with mutually exclusive events)  satisfies 

Some authors consider merely finitely additive probability spaces, in which case one just needs an algebra of sets, rather than a σ-algebra.  Quasiprobability distributions in general relax the third axiom.

Consequences 
From the Kolmogorov axioms, one can deduce other useful rules for studying probabilities. The proofs of these rules are a very insightful procedure that illustrates the power of the third axiom, and its interaction with the remaining two axioms. Four of the immediate corollaries and their proofs are shown below:

Monotonicity 

If A is a subset of, or equal to B, then the probability of A is less than, or equal to the probability of B.

Proof of monotonicity 
Hence, we obtain from the third axiom that

The probability of the empty set 

 

In many cases,  is not the only event with probability 0.

Proof of the probability of the empty set

 since ,

 by applying the third axiom to the left-hand side 
(note  is disjoint with itself), and so

 by subtracting  from each side of the equation.

The complement rule

Proof of the complement rule 

           ... (by axiom 3)

and,                          ... (by axiom 2)

The numeric bound 
It immediately follows from the monotonicity property that

Proof of the numeric bound 
Given the complement rule  and axiom 1 :

Further consequences 
Another important property is:

 

This is called the addition law of probability, or the sum rule.
That is, the probability that an event in A or B will happen is the sum of the probability of an event in A and the probability of an event in B, minus the probability of an event that is in both A and B. The proof of this is as follows:

Firstly,

          ... (by Axiom 3)

So,

 (by ).

Also,

and eliminating  from both equations gives us the desired result.

An extension of the addition law to any number of sets is the inclusion–exclusion principle.

Setting B to the complement Ac of A in the addition law gives

 

That is, the probability that any event will not happen (or the event's complement) is 1 minus the probability that it will.

Simple example: coin toss 
Consider a single coin-toss, and assume that the coin will either land heads (H) or tails (T) (but not both).  No assumption is made as to whether the coin is fair.

We may define:

 
 

Kolmogorov's axioms imply that:

 
The probability of neither heads nor tails, is 0.

 
The probability of either heads or tails, is 1.

 
The sum of the probability of heads and the probability of tails, is 1.

See also

References

Further reading 
 
 
Formal definition of probability in the Mizar system, and the list of theorems formally proved about it.

Probability theory
Mathematical axioms